Walshia detracta is a moth in the family Cosmopterigidae. It was described by Lord Walsingham in 1909. It is found in Mexico.

References

Moths described in 1909
Chrysopeleiinae